= Birch (restaurant) =

Restaurant in Milwaukee, Wisconsin, U.S.

- Interactive map of Birch

Restaurant information
- Location: 459 East Pleasant Street, Milwaukee, Wisconsin, 53202, United States
- Coordinates: 43°3′3.3″N 87°54′24.7″W
- Website: birchonpleasant.com

Birch is a restaurant in Milwaukee, Wisconsin. Established in May 2021, the business was included in The New York Times's 2023 list of the 50 best restaurants in the United States.
